Talagi is a rural locality (a settlement) and the administrative center of Talazhskoye Rural Settlement of Primorsky District, Arkhangelsk Oblast, Russia. The population was 1,829 as of 2010.

Geography 
Talagi is located 15 km northeast of Arkhangelsk (the district's administrative centre) by road. Povrakulskaya is the nearest rural locality.

References 

Rural localities in Primorsky District, Arkhangelsk Oblast